Asian Workers Development Institute, Rourkela (AWDI) is a management institute located in sector 06 of city Rourkela. It was established in the year 1981 under Bastia Memorial Trust. The Institute is affiliated to AICTE and Sambalpur University. In the year 2013 Business Today ranked AWDI at 183 as India's business school of east region of Odisha.

References

Business schools in Odisha
Universities and colleges in Rourkela
Colleges affiliated to Sambalpur University
Educational institutions established in 1981
1981 establishments in Orissa